Cottam is a hamlet and civil parish in the East Riding of Yorkshire, England. The hamlet is west of the B1249 Skipsea to Staxton road, and in the Yorkshire Wolds.

The civil parish is formed by the hamlet of Cottam, and Cowlam  to its north-west. According to the 2011 UK census, Cottam parish had a population of 108, an increase on the 2001 UK census figure of 74, which was the lowest population figure of any East Riding of Yorkshire civil parish in 2001.

History
According to A Dictionary of British Place Names, Cottam derives from the Old English 'cot' (plural: cotum), meaning "a place at the cottages or huts". In the Domesday Book the manor is written as 'cottun' Cottam was in the Hundred of Toreshou, of nine geld units—taxable units assessed by hide area—and contained five ploughlands. In 1066 the lordship was held by  Ulf of Carlton, who held sixteen manors in the north of Yorkshire, transferred in 1086 to the Archbishop of York, Thomas of Bayeux, who was also Tenant-in-chief to king William I.

Cottam was previously an Anglo-Scandinavian medieval village that was deserted. All that remains today is the now derelict Church of Holy Trinity which was rebuilt in 1818 and again . The font of the first Norman church on the site is now in Langtoft church.

In 1823, Baines recorded that 'Cotham' was in the parish of Langtoft, the wapentake of Dickering, and the liberty of St Peter's, and noted a chapel of ease to the parish church at Langtoft. The population of sixteen included a curate and a gentleman farmer.

RAF Cottam was built as a bomber airfield in the Second World War but was never used for flying. Later the runways were used for bomb storage and the buildings were demolished in 1980.

References

External links

Civil parishes in the East Riding of Yorkshire
Deserted medieval villages in the East Riding of Yorkshire